D214 state road is located in the eastern part of Slavonia region of Croatia connecting the cities and towns of Županja and Gunja to the state road network of Croatia, most notably to the A3 motorway Županja interchange via D55 state road and Gunja border crossing to Brčko, Bosnia and Herzegovina.

The road, as well as all other state roads in Croatia, is managed and maintained by Hrvatske ceste, state-owned company.

Traffic volume 

Traffic is regularly counted and reported by Hrvatske ceste, operator of the road.

Road junctions and populated areas

Sources

State roads in Croatia
Vukovar-Syrmia County